Sud Khor (also Romanized as Sūd Khor; also known as Galā'm and Sūd Khvor) is a village in Qalandarabad Rural District, Qalandarabad District, Fariman County, Razavi Khorasan Province, Iran. At the 2006 census, its population was 91, in 22 families.

References 

Populated places in Fariman County